The Interaction and Robotics Research Center (IRRC) is an HCI/Robotics research center of Korea Institute of Science and Technology located in Seoul, Republic of Korea.

Major research field
Human-centered Robotics for Coexistence
Coexistent Interaction & Interface
Human-Computer/Human-Robot Interaction Technology
Network-based Humanoid Robotics
Bio-mimetic Intelligent Control and Cognitive Mobile Manipulation
Learning and Intelligence Technology by Sensor Fusion
R-Learning Technology

Research Teams
Cognitive Humanoid Research Group 
Interaction & Visualization Research Group 
Center of Human-centered Interaction for Coexistence

External links
 KIST website

Robotics organizations